Lumpkins Stadium is a stadium in Waxahachie, Texas.  It is primarily used for American football, and is the home field of the Waxahachie Indians. The stadium is named for Stuart B. Lumpkins, a former superintendent of Waxahachie Independent School District. In 2011, the stadium received renovations that were funded through a city bond. In addition to serving as the home field for the Waxahachie Indians football team, Lumpkins also hosts Waxahachie Indian soccer and an annual track and field meet.  The stadium has also been used as a neutral site for University Interscholastic League playoff games in both football and soccer. Southwestern Assemblies of God University also holds its home football games at the stadium.

References

College football venues
Southwestern Assemblies of God Lions football
Buildings and structures in Ellis County, Texas
High school football venues in Texas
Waxahachie, Texas
Soccer venues in Texas